Yila Timothy Kang (born March 16, 1973) is an American actor. He is known for his role as Kimball Cho in the television series The Mentalist and Gordon Katsumoto in the CBS/NBC reboot series Magnum P.I.

Early life and education
Kang was born in San Francisco, California, and is the eldest of three brothers. He graduated with a Bachelor of Arts in political science from the University of California, Berkeley, and a Master of Fine Arts from Harvard's Institute for Advanced Theater Training at the American Repertory Theater and the Moscow Art Theatre. 

Kang began acting at age 26. He had been working in the finance industry at the Pacific Exchange when he passed by the American Conservatory Theater and signed up for night acting classes on a whim. In an interview with the Korea Society, he stated that he decided to switch to acting full-time when he realized that he could no longer concentrate on his day job at the exchange.

Career
Kang was a series regular on CBS's The Mentalist as Special Agent Kimball Cho. He appeared in Rambo (2008) and also on such TV shows as The Office, Chappelle's Show,  The Vampire Diaries and Monk. He returned to his theater roots for Julia Cho's new play Aubergine, playing one of the lead characters, Ray. It premiered at the Berkeley Repertory Theatre in February 2016 before touring to various theatres.

In 2012, Kang launched a production company named One Shoot Films with its first film project focusing on child abduction and sexually abused children. 
Kang recurred as Ivan Hess on Marvel's Cloak & Dagger. He is a series regular as Detective Gordon Katsumoto on the 2018 reboot of Magnum P.I.. After four seasons led to cancellation on CBS, he continued in the role following the series's pickup by NBC.

Personal life
Kang has a black belt in Taekwondo.

With wife actress Gina Marie May, Kang has a daughter, Bianca Jooyung Kang, born November 7, 2009.

Kang is a national spokesman and active supporter for the National Center for Missing and Exploited Children.

Filmography

Film

Television

Video games

References

External links 
 

1973 births
American male film actors
American male actors of Korean descent
American male television actors
Institute for Advanced Theater Training, Harvard University alumni
Living people
University of California, Berkeley alumni
21st-century American male actors